In the 2015 Canadian federal election, the Conservative Party of Canada ran a candidate in all but one of the 338 federal electoral districts. Ninety-nine of them won a seat in the House of Commons of Canada, which was 60 fewer than in the previous federal election in 2011.

Candidate statistics

Newfoundland and Labrador - 7 seats

Prince Edward Island - 4 seats

Nova Scotia - 11 seats

New Brunswick - 10 seats

Quebec - 78 seats

Ontario - 121 seats

Manitoba - 14 seats

Saskatchewan - 14 seats

Alberta - 34 seats

British Columbia - 42 seats

Yukon - 1 seat

Northwest Territories - 1 seat

Nunavut - 1 seat

See also
Results of the Canadian federal election, 2011
Results by riding for the Canadian federal election, 2011

References

External links
 Conservative Party of Canada website
 Elections Canada – List of Confirmed Candidates for the 41st General Election
Immigration Consultant in Canada

2015